Sanaullah Panipati (1143 AH -1225) was a Sunni Muslim scholar and an exegete from Panipat who authored the Tafsir al-Mazhari.

Biography
Pānipati was born in 1143 AH. Aged seven, he memorized the Quran and then completed the studies of hadith under Shah Waliullah. He became a "murid" of Muhammad Abid Sinani, and became a disciple of Mirza Mazhar Jan-e-Janaan after Sinani's death.

Pānipati died in 1225 AH and was buried in Panipat.

Literary works
Saif ul Maslool (This book was written against Shia like Tauhfa Ithna Ashari by Shah Abdul Aziz (11 October 1746 - 5 June 1824)
Tafsir al-Mazhari
Mala Budda Minhu
Fasal e Khitab
Irshad al-Talibeen
Tazkara tul Miaad (Abridgment of Al badoor al Safira fi Amoor al Akhira by Jalal al-Din al-Suyuti)
Tazkara tul Uloom Wal Mua'arif
Khujista Guftaar Dar Manaqib e Ansar (A risala about manaqib of ansar his maternal forefathers)
Taqdees ba Walid e Mustafa (Risala about the parents of Islamic prophet Muhammad)

Views
In his work Ma La Budda Minhu, Qadi Thanaullah emphasized that it is kufr (an act of unbelief) "to suppose that something other than Allah is the true creator of any part of creation". This applies to whatever a human being strives to build, create, or make happen, because it is actually not them but Allah who "creates that act and brings it into existence".

The attributes of God, (his throne, his hand and face, presence in the hearts of believers, descent into the lowest heaven) mentioned in the 
Quran and hadith must not be understood in their literal sense, and neither should we attempt to find interpretations (Ta'weel) for them. We should simply have faith in these things and ... we should entrust their interpretation to the knowledge of the Almighty. Man's lost in these matters ... is no more than ignorance and confusion."

He believed that the Prophets and angels are ma'soom or divinely protected from wrongdoing, but not the Shaaba (companions of the prophets) or Ahl al-Bayt (family of Muhammad). However to believe that the Shaaba did not get along is "to deny the Quran".

References

Bibliography
 

Sharia judges
Year of birth unknown
1810 deaths
Naqshbandi order
Hanafis
Maturidis
1730 births
18th-century Indian Muslims
18th-century Indian biographers
18th-century Indian educators
18th-century Indian historians
18th-century Indian judges
18th-century Indian jurists
18th-century Indian non-fiction writers
18th-century Indian philosophers
18th-century Indian scholars
19th-century Indian Muslims
19th-century Indian biographers
19th-century Indian educators
19th-century Indian essayists
19th-century Indian historians
19th-century Indian non-fiction writers
19th-century Indian philosophers
19th-century Indian scholars
19th-century Indian judges
19th-century Indian jurists
People from Panipat
Indian Sunni Muslim scholars of Islam